WD repeat containing planar cell polarity effector is a protein that in humans is encoded by the WDPCP gene.

Function

This gene encodes a cytoplasmic WD40 repeat protein. A similar gene in frogs encodes a planar cell polarity protein that plays a critical role in collective cell movement and ciliogenesis by mediating septin localization. Mutations in this gene are associated with Bardet-Biedl syndrome 15 and may also play a role in Meckel-Gruber syndrome. Alternative splicing results in multiple transcript variants.

References

Further reading